The Petoskey News-Review is the daily newspaper of Petoskey, Michigan.

History 
Started in 1878 as the Petoskey City Record, after subsequent mergers it became The Petoskey Evening News. In 1953, this paper merged with The Northern Michigan Review to become the Petoskey News-Review. In 2006, the paper, along with its sister publications, was purchased by Schurz Communications of South Bend, Indiana. In 2019, it was sold to GateHouse Media. The paper publishes daily five days a week.

References

External links
 

Newspapers published in Michigan
Emmet County, Michigan
Publications established in 1878
1878 establishments in Michigan
Gannett publications